Sprint football, formerly called lightweight football, is a varsity sport played by United States colleges and universities, under standard American football rules.  Since the 2022 season, the sport has been governed by the Collegiate Sprint Football League and the Midwest Sprint Football League.

In sprint football, players must maintain a weight of 178 lb or 81 kg or less and a minimum of 5% body fat to be eligible to play. The end result of these weight restrictions is that, unlike conventional collegiate football which places a premium on body weight and strength, sprint football emphasizes speed and agility.

Competition

As of the 2023 season, nine schools play in the CSFL and eight in the Midwest Sprint Football League. Of the nine CSFL members, six are private universities (two being schools in the Ivy League) and two are national military academies. All eight MSFL members are private institutions. CSFL member Mansfield University of Pennsylvania is the only state university or college currently playing sprint football.

CSFL 
All CSFL teams are located in the northeastern and mid-Atlantic United States. Seven schools joined in the 21st century, one in 2008 and the others in the 2010s; five remain active in sprint football today. Of these new members, two no longer sponsor the sport—Franklin Pierce University, which joined in 2012, transitioned to full-sized football in NCAA Division II after the 2018 season, and Post University, which joined in 2010, did the same after the canceled 2020 season. Of the other 21st-century arrivals, only Alderson Broaddus University, also a Division II member, has a full-size varsity football team. The other four teams (all of which have been in the CSFL since 1957) have full-size football teams that compete in NCAA Division I—the service academies in FBS, and the Ivy League schools in FCS. Each team plays a seven-game season. It is not uncommon for the CSFL teams to play against full-size junior varsity or club football squads from other schools in the early part of the season (in 2015, for instance, Navy faced the Longwood Lancers). In addition, Army, Cornell, Princeton, and Penn all hold alumni games in which sprint football alumni return to campus for a full-contact scrimmage against the varsity squad. The alumni games serve the dual purpose of raising funds to support the team and maintaining alumni interest in the program.  Typically, the alumni have to donate a monetary weight penalty (e.g., $2 per pound) for weighing above the 178-pound limit. In 2017, when Caldwell joined, the CSFL was split into two divisions, the North and the South. On December 7, 2017, St. Thomas Aquinas College was announced as the tenth team in the league, to begin play in the 2018 season. After that season,  Franklin Pierce left to play full-sized football and was replaced by Alderson Broaddus.

As of 2022, only one charter member of the league remains, the Penn Quakers. The Princeton Tigers dropped the sport after 2015, following 16 consecutive years of winless seasons (an organized football record) and changes in league membership, and shifted its resources to club football. A number of other Ivy League schools have historically had sprint football teams, including the Yale Bulldogs, Harvard Crimson, and Columbia Lions, all of whom had dropped the sport many years earlier; of the Ivy League schools, only Penn and the Cornell Big Red remain.

For its first 83 seasons, the CSFL did not sponsor playoff or bowl games (a tradition due in no small part to the Ivy League schools, who, like the rest of the Ivy League, abstain from all football postseason play to encourage academic performance). The season championship was decided solely by the regular season record; if multiple teams were tied atop the standings, all of them shared the championship. Since Navy's and Army's respective admissions to the league, those two schools have dominated the league; of the 72 seasons of lightweight football since Navy joined, they and/or Army have won at least a share of the league title in 64 of them, including stretches of 20 consecutive seasons from 1955–74 and 17 straight from 1983–99. Since the 2017 season, a championship game has been held on Veterans Day weekend.

Although CSFL and MSFL teams are considered varsity teams and official school-sponsored sports for the purpose of the NCAA, sprint football teams do not fall into the same divisional structure as other NCAA sports and thus do not follow the same rules or restrictions on athletic scholarships as traditional college football squads are bound to follow.

In April 2020, the CSFL chose Dan Mara, also Commissioner of the Central Atlantic Collegiate Conference (CACC) as Commissioner. In July of that year, the league voted to not play a fall 2020 season out of concern over the COVID-19 pandemic, over the objections of Army and Navy, who indicated an intent to continue play without the other eight teams. In addition to a single Army-Navy game in the fall, Caldwell and St. Thomas Aquinas played a single game in spring 2021. The league resumed normal operations in fall 2021.

MSFL 
The MSFL was formed in 2021, with play starting in 2022, by six private institutions in the Midwest and Upper South. The league has its own bylaws and championship, but uses the same weight limits as the CSFL. The creation of the MSFL was touted as "the largest single-year expansion of the sport in nearly 90 years." Of the inaugural members, all are Catholic except for Midway University. Only Bellarmine University is an NCAA Division I member (it is currently transitioning from NCAA Division II). Quincy University, a Division II member, is the only charter MSFL member that also plays full-sized football. Another charter member is NCAA Division III and the other three are NAIA members.

The league added two members, both private institutions, after its first season. Oakland City University, an NAIA member that does not play full-sized football, announced on July 19, 2022 that it was adding sprint football for the 2023 season. In the process, it became the MSFL's second non-Catholic member, instead being affiliated with the General Baptist churches. Exactly three months later, Walsh University, a Catholic institution and NCAA Division II member that plays full-sized football, announced it would also add sprint football for 2023.

Weight limit
League rules specify official weigh-ins four days and two days before each game. Players must weigh 178lbs (82.6 kg) four days and 2 days prior to game day. Players are allowed to gain weight back after meeting the weight limit

Notable players 

Hoodie Allen (Steven Markowitz), American "rapper", played defensive back at Penn.
Joseph Robinette "Beau" Biden III, former Attorney General of Delaware, played at Penn.
Antonio Buehler, civil liberties activist battling police corruption, Founder of Peaceful Streets Project. (United States Military Academy)
Jimmy Carter, former US President, played for the United States Naval Academy.
C. J. Chivers, Pulitzer Prize winning journalist and author; played for Cornell
Zach Iscol, US Marine Corps veteran (Bronze Star), entrepreneur, candidate in the 2021 New York City Comptroller election; played for Cornell.
Robert Kraft, billionaire businessman and owner of the New England Patriots and the New England Revolution. (Columbia University)
Richard W. Mies, US Navy Admiral (Defense Distinguished Service Medal); played for Navy
Donald Rumsfeld, former Secretary of Defense, played sprint football for Princeton and was a captain.
Vincent Viola, billionaire businessman, philanthropist. (United States Military Academy)

Notable coaches
George Allen, Pro Football Hall of Fame coach, most notably with the Washington Redskins, was an assistant sprint football coach at the University of Michigan in 1947.
Jack Cloud, College Football Hall of Famer, former NFL player (in 1990); Cloud came to the Naval Academy in 1959 and spent the next 32 years in Annapolis coaching football, and the head lightweight (now called sprint) football coach from 1958–61, 1963–72, and 1980–82, in addition to teaching in the Physical Education Department.
The Cullen family has been sprint football's leading advocates.  Robert Cullen revived the Cornell team as its coach in 1946 following a suspension for World War II.  His son, Terry Cullen became offensive coordinator in 1965 and co-head coach in the 1970s, and continues in that position.
Dick Harter, college and NBA head coach, coached at Penn from 1958–1964.
Tim McGuire, American football college coach; defensive coordinator for Navy
Jack McCloskey, college and NBA head coach, coached at Penn from 1954–1955.
Sean Morey, former NFL player, coached the Princeton sprint squad for its last two seasons of existence.
Tony Franklin, former OC at Cal, Kentucky, Auburn, among others, offensive coordinator for Army West Point 2022.
Mike Siani, played wide receiver for the Oakland Raiders and Baltimore Colts; was the quarterbacks and wide receivers coach for Princeton.
Eric Tipton, College Football Hall of Famer, Major League Baseball outfielder (1939–1945);  Tipton was an assistant baseball and football coach at the College of William & Mary for 18 seasons, and then was the head baseball coach and Lightweight football coach at the United States Military Academy.

See also

List of Collegiate Sprint Football League champions

External links
Official CSFL website
Official Alderson Broaddus sprint football page
Official Army sprint football page
Official Caldwell sprint football page
Official Chestnut Hill sprint football page
Official Cornell sprint football page
 Official Mansfield sprint football page
Official Navy sprint football page
Official Penn sprint football page
Official St. Thomas Aquinas sprint football page
 Official MSFL website
 Official Bellarmine sprint football page
 Official Calumet sprint football page
 Official Fontbonne sprint football page
 Official Midway sprint football page
 Official Oakland City sprint football page
 Official Quincy sprint football page
 Official St. Mary-of-the-Woods sprint football page
 Official Walsh sprint football page
New York Times article about Sprint Football
Cornell Daily Sun article about Sprint Football
Caldwell University Adds Sprint Football for Fall 2017

References

 
College football in the United States
Variations of American football